Bog-à-Lanières Ecological Reserve is an ecological reserve of Quebec, Canada. The ecological reserve aims to ensure the protection of  ombrotrophic peatlands in the Laurentians region. It is also one of the rare thong bog in Quebec.

History 
This Reserve was established on April 8, 1992 by a decree of the Government of Quebec.

Toponymy 
The name of the reserve comes from the scientific name of ombrotrophic peatland, a type of peatland fed only by precipitation or water table

Geography 
The reserve is located at Lac-Édouard, about sixty kilometres east of La Tuque.

External links
 Official website from Government of Québec

References

Protected areas of Mauricie
Nature reserves in Quebec
Protected areas established in 1992
1992 establishments in Quebec
Geography of La Tuque, Quebec